Kabakum is a village in Dikili district of İzmir Province, Turkey. It is to the north of Dikili. The population of the village  is 1,478 as of 2011.

References

Villages in Dikili District